Bransfield Island is an island nearly  long, lying  southwest of D'Urville Island off the northeast end of the Antarctic Peninsula. The name "Point Bransfield", after Edward Bransfield, Master, Royal Navy, was given in 1842 by a British expedition under James Clark Ross to the low western termination of what is now the Joinville Island group. A 1947 survey by the Falkland Islands Dependencies Survey determined that this western termination is a separate island.

This is one of several Antarctic islands around the peninsula known as Graham Land, which is closer to South America than any other part of that continent. Burden Passage separates Bransfield Island from D'Urville Island.

See also
 Knobble Head, a feature of Bransfield Island.

References 

Islands of the Joinville Island group